Showboaters is a British reality show that was broadcast on Sky1 from 13 September to 6 November 2011.

Ten amateur performers are in competition to become the main act aboard a luxury cruise liner.
Singer Songwriter Ben Boden was amongst the ten performers, and was one of the final contestants featured on all eight streamed episodes.

External links

Sky UK original programming
2010s British reality television series
2011 British television series debuts
2011 British television series endings